East District is an urban district in Taichung, Taiwan. It was a part of Taichung City before the City and County were merged in 2010.

History
The district used to be part of the Taichung provincial city before the merger with Taichung County to form the Taichung special municipality on 25 December 2010.

Administrative divisions
East District is divided into 17 villages, which are: Xinzhuang, Zhenxing, Tungqiao, Tungxing, Quanyuan, Gancheng, Hanxi, Lecheng, Tungmen, Shijia, Tungying, Tungnan, Tungshi, Gezuo, Furen, Futai and Tungxin.

Tourist attractions

 Hanxi Night Market
 Dongguang Green Tunnel (東光錄園道)
 Lecheng Temple
 Lin Family Ancestral Shrine
 Zhang Liao Family Temple

Transportation
The district is served the Jingwu and Taichung stations of the Taiwan Railways Administration.

See also
 Taichung

References

External links

  

Districts of Taichung